Aga Khan Higher Secondary School, Gilgit or AKHSS, Gilgit is a high school and college, located in Konodas, near Gilgit river. It's part of the Agha Khan education Network. The school was established in 1998. It is affiliated with Agha Khan University Examination Board.

Facilities
1. Computer Lab
2. Library
3. Science Laboratories
4. Language Resource Centre
5. Conference Hall
6. Canteen

See also
 Aga Khan Higher Secondary School, Gahkuch
 Aga Khan Higher Secondary School for Girls, Hunza
 Aga Khan School
 Cadet College Skardu

References

Boarding schools in Pakistan
Schools in Gilgit-Baltistan
Universities and colleges in Gilgit-Baltistan